Mala Goričica is a small settlement in the hills north of Stična in the Municipality of Ivančna Gorica in central Slovenia. The area is part of the historical region of Lower Carniola and is now included in the Central Slovenia Statistical Region.

Name
The name of the settlement was changed from Goričica to Mala Goričica in 1955.

References

External links

Mala Goričica on Geopedia

Populated places in the Municipality of Ivančna Gorica